Wilhelm Porrassalmi (18 December 1930 – 21 December 2006) was a Finnish athlete. He competed in the men's long jump at the 1956 Summer Olympics.

References

External links
 

1930 births
2006 deaths
Athletes (track and field) at the 1956 Summer Olympics
Finnish male long jumpers
Olympic athletes of Finland
Place of birth missing